Sabah Al-Salem (Arabic: صباح السالم) is an area in Kuwait, belonging to the Mubarak Al-Kabeer Governorate. As of 2022, its population is 139,163, spread out over 13 blocks. Sabah Al-Salem is a mixed one with residential, commercial, educational and entertainment facilities.

Sabah Al Salem's Blocks 
Block 1 of Sabah Al-Salem has many activities and places to be. Those places include restaurants, like McDonald's and Starbucks, salons, football and padel fields, schools, apartments, hospitals, gyms, and more.

Blocks 2 and 3 also have many places similar to block 1, but they aren't as popular.

Blocks 4 throughout 13 are residential areas. They house most of Sabah Al Salem's 90,000, and are also a home to some restaurants, schools, and more.

Demographics 
Sabah Al Salem is pretty balanced, as all things should be. According to the Public Authority for Civil Information, Kuwaiti's make up 53,393, or 57.66% of this area's population and non-Kuwaitis, on the other hand, make up around 39,213, or 42.34% There are 45,771 males and 46,835 females.

Location 
Sabah Al Salem is bordered by Mishref to the North, Adān to the south, Sabhan to the West, and Messila to the East and Southeast. It's close to everything, being (on average) 15 minutes away from every attraction.

Name Origins 
This area was named after the 12th Ruler of Kuwait and the 2nd Emir of the State of Kuwait, Sheikh Sabah Al-Salim Al-Sabah.

Sabah Al-Salem's Food 
- About four Starbucks stores

- Milkbun

- Pick

- Costa Coffee

- Rock House Sliders

- McDonald's

- Kentucky Fried Chicken

- Trolley

- Dukkan

+ More

Sabah Al Salem's Schools 
- Hayat Universal Bilingual School

- American United School

- International School of Kuwait

- A'Takamul International School

- Al Awael Bilingual School

- Al Ru'ya Bilingual School

- AlReyada Model School

Sabah Al Salem's Other Stuff 
- MSF Kuwait (Football Fields)

- Sabah Al-Salem Restaurant Block 9 "Light" Food

- Shaikh Saad Al-Abdullah Sport Hall Complex

+ More

See also
List of cities in Kuwait
Kuwait
Kuwait City
Kuwait's Governorates 
Mishref (Allies)
Abdu

References

Suburbs of Kuwait City
Populated places in Kuwait
Districts of Mubarak Al-Kabeer Governorate